The Suzuki 125 GP racers were a series of 125cc racing motorcycles designed, developed, and built by Suzuki, to compete in the Grand Prix motorcycle racing world championship, between 1960 and 1968.

References

125 GP
Grand Prix motorcycles